Heteropalpia is a genus of moths in the family Erebidae. The genus was erected by Emilio Berio in 1939.

Species
 Heteropalpia acrosticta Püngeler, 1904
 Heteropalpia cortytoides Berio, 1939
 Heteropalpia makabana Hacker & Fibiger, 2006
 Heteropalpia profesta Christoph, 1887
 Heteropalpia rosacea Rebel, 1907
 Heteropalpia vetusta Walker, 1865
 Heteropalpia wiltshirei Hacker & Ebert, 2002

References

Hacker, H. & Fibiger, M. (2006). "Updated list of Micronoctuidae, Noctuidae (s.l.), and Hyblaeidae species of Yemen, collected during three expeditions in 1996, 1998 and 2000, with comments and descriptions of species". Esperiana Buchreihe zur Entomologie. 12: 75-166.

Ophiusini
Moth genera